Edmund Henry Sutton (27 July 1838 – 24 April 1893) was an Australian politician.

Sutton was born in Launceston in Tasmania in 1838. In 1886 he was elected to the Tasmanian House of Assembly, representing the seat of Cressy. He served until his death in Launceston in 1893.

References

1838 births
1893 deaths
Members of the Tasmanian House of Assembly